The 2001 Canoe Slalom World Cup was a series of six races in 4 canoeing and kayaking categories organized by the International Canoe Federation (ICF). It was the 14th edition. The series consisted of 5 regular world cup races and the world cup final.

Calendar

Final standings 

The winner of each world cup race was awarded 30 points. The world cup final points scale was multiplied by a factor of 1.5. That meant the winner of the world cup final earned 45 points. The points scale reached down to 1 point for 20th place in the men's K1, while in the other three categories only the top 15 received points (with 6 points for 15th place). Only the best three results of each athlete counted for the final world cup standings.

Results

World Cup Race 1 
The first world cup race of the season took place in Goumois, France from 26 to 27 May.

World Cup Race 2 
The second world cup race of the season took place in Merano, Italy from 2 to 3 June.

World Cup Race 3 
The third world cup race of the season took place at the Tacen Whitewater Course, Slovenia from 9 to 10 June.

World Cup Race 4 
The fourth world cup race of the season took place at the Augsburg Eiskanal, Germany from 27 to 29 July.

World Cup Race 5 
The fifth world cup race of the season took place at the Prague-Troja Canoeing Centre, Czech Republic from 3 to 5 August.

World Cup Final 
The final world cup race of the season took place in Wausau, Wisconsin from 8 to 9 September.

References

External links 
 International Canoe Federation

Canoe Slalom World Cup
Canoe Slalom World Cup